The 2015 Rally Catalunya (formally the 51. RallyRACC Catalunya – Costa Daurada) was the twelfth round of the 2015 World Rally Championship. The race was held over four days between 22 October and 25 October 2015, and operated out of Salou, Catalonia, Spain. Volkswagen's Andreas Mikkelsen won the race, his first win in the World Rally Championship.

Special stages

References

External links
Rally data from eWRC-results.com

Catalunya
Rally Catalunya
Catalunya Rally